The Vindicator was a Ulster Catholic newspaper founded in May 1839 and published in Belfast.

History
The newspaper was founded by a group of Roman Catholics in Belfast, including Charles Gavan Duffy and Rev. Dr. George Crolly. The paper was published twice weekly (on Wednesdays and Saturdays), first from 10 Ann Street, and subsequently from 20 Rosemary Street, in Belfast.  The newspaper supported Daniel O'Connell's repeal movement, and he was asked to nominate an editor.  O'Connell proposed T.M. Hughes, but when he declined, Duffy was appointed to the role.

In 1842 Duffy was prosecuted for libel, and left the paper, to launch The Nation in Dublin.  He was succeeded as editor by Kevin T. Buggy (1817–1843), who died in August 1843 and was in turn succeeded by C.D. Fitzgerald, who edited the paper until 1846.

Contributors to The Vindicator included James Clarence Mangan, Thomas Murray Hughes, and in later years Thomas MacNevin.

The Vindicator later moved to a weekly release schedule, and was sometimes called The Weekly Vindicator in that period.  It ceased publication in September 1848.

References

Defunct newspapers published in Ireland
Newspapers established in 1839
Defunct weekly newspapers
Mass media in Belfast
1839 establishments in Ireland
Publications disestablished in 1848
1848 disestablishments in Ireland